This is a list of the bird species recorded in Venezuela. The avifauna of Venezuela has 1402 confirmed species, of which 45 are endemic, six have been introduced by humans, 35 are rare or vagrants, and one has been extirpated. An additional 21 species are hypothetical (see below).

Except as an entry is cited otherwise, the list of species is that of the South American Classification Committee (SACC) of the American Ornithological Society. The list's taxonomic treatment (designation and sequence of orders, families, and species) and nomenclature (common and scientific names) are also those of the SACC.

The following tags have been used to highlight certain categories of occurrence.

(V) Vagrant - a species that rarely or accidentally occurs in Venezuela
(E) Endemic - a species endemic to Venezuela
(I) Introduced - a species introduced to Venezuela as a consequence, direct or indirect, of human actions
(H) Hypothetical - a species recorded but with "no tangible evidence" according to the SACC

Tinamous
Order: TinamiformesFamily: Tinamidae

The tinamous are one of the most ancient groups of bird. Although they look similar to other ground-dwelling birds like quail and grouse, they have no close relatives and are classified as a single family, Tinamidae, within their own order, the Tinamiformes. They are distantly related to the ratites (order Struthioniformes), that includes the rheas, emus, and kiwis. Fourteen species have been recorded in Venezuela.

Tawny-breasted tinamou, Nothocercus julius
Highland tinamou, Nothocercus bonapartei
Gray tinamou, Tinamus tao
Great tinamou, Tinamus major
White-throated tinamou, Tinamus guttatus
Cinereous tinamou, Crypturellus cinereus
Little tinamou, Crypturellus soui
Tepui tinamou, Crypturellus ptaritepui (E)
Brown tinamou, Crypturellus obsoletus
Undulated tinamou, Crypturellus undulatus
Gray-legged tinamou, Crypturellus duidae
Red-legged tinamou, Crypturellus erythropus
Variegated tinamou, Crypturellus variegatus
Barred tinamou, Crypturellus casiquiare

Screamers
Order: AnseriformesFamily: Anhimidae

The screamers are a small family of birds related to the ducks. They are large bulky birds, with a small downy head, long legs and large feet which are only partially webbed. They have large spurs on their wings which are used in fights over mates and in territorial disputes. Two species have been recorded in Venezuela.

Horned screamer, Anhima cornuta
Northern screamer, Chauna chavaria

Ducks
Order: AnseriformesFamily: Anatidae

Anatidae includes the ducks and most duck-like waterfowl, such as geese and swans. These birds are adapted to an aquatic existence with webbed feet, flattened bills, and feathers that are excellent at shedding water due to an oily coating. Twenty-one species have been recorded in Venezuela.

Fulvous whistling-duck, Dendrocygna bicolor
White-faced whistling-duck, Dendrocygna viduata
Black-bellied whistling-duck, Dendrocygna autumnalis
Orinoco goose, Oressochen jubata
Muscovy duck, Cairina moschata
Comb duck, Sarkidiornis sylvicola
Brazilian teal, Amazonetta brasiliensis
Torrent duck, Merganetta armata
Northern shoveler, Spatula clypeata
Blue-winged teal, Spatula discors
Cinnamon teal, Spatula cyanoptera
Eurasian wigeon, Mareca penelope (H)
American wigeon, Mareca americana
White-cheeked pintail, Anas bahamensis
Northern pintail, Anas acuta
Green-winged teal, Anas crecca (V)
Andean teal, Anas andium
Southern pochard, Netta erythrophthalma
Ring-necked duck, Aythya collaris
Lesser scaup, Aythya affinis
Masked duck, Nomonyx dominicus

Guans
Order: GalliformesFamily: Cracidae

The Cracidae are large birds, similar in general appearance to turkeys. The guans and curassows live in trees, but the smaller chachalacas are found in more open scrubby habitats. They are generally dull-plumaged, but the curassows and some guans have colorful facial ornaments. Fourteen species have been recorded in Venezuela.

Band-tailed guan, Penelope argyrotis
Andean guan, Penelope montagnii
Marail guan, Penelope marail
Spix's guan, Penelope jacquacu
Crested guan, Penelope purpurascens
Blue-throated piping-guan, Pipile cumanensis
Wattled guan, Aburria aburri
Rufous-vented chachalaca, Ortalis ruficauda
Variable chachalaca, Ortalis motmot
Nocturnal curassow, Nothocrax urumutum
Yellow-knobbed curassow, Crax daubentoni
Black curassow, Crax alector
Crestless curassow, Mitu tomentosum
Helmeted curassow, Pauxi pauxi

New World quails
Order: GalliformesFamily: Odontophoridae

The New World quails are small, plump terrestrial birds only distantly related to the quails of the Old World, but named for their similar appearance and habits. Four species have been recorded in Venezuela.

Crested bobwhite, Colinus cristatus
Marbled wood-quail, Odontophorus gujanensis
Black-fronted wood-quail, Odontophorus atrifrons
Venezuelan wood-quail, Odontophorus columbianus (E)

Flamingos
Order: PhoenicopteriformesFamily: Phoenicopteridae

Flamingos filter-feed on shellfish and algae. Their oddly shaped beaks are specially adapted to separate mud and silt from the food they consume and, uniquely, are used upside-down. One species has been recorded in Venezuela.

American flamingo, Phoenicopterus ruber

Grebes
Order: PodicipediformesFamily: Podicipedidae

Grebes are small to medium-large freshwater diving birds. They have lobed toes and are excellent swimmers and divers. However, they have their feet placed far back on the body, making them quite ungainly on land. Two species have been recorded in Venezuela.

Least grebe, Tachybaptus dominicus
Pied-billed grebe, Podilymbus podiceps

Pigeons
Order: ColumbiformesFamily: Columbidae

Pigeons and doves are stout-bodied birds with short necks and short slender bills with a fleshy cere. Twenty-two species have been recorded in Venezuela.

Rock pigeon, Columba livia (I)
White-crowned pigeon, Patagioenas leucocephala (V)
Scaled pigeon, Patagioenas speciosa
Scaly-naped pigeon, Patagioenas squamosa
Bare-eyed pigeon, Patagioenas corensis
Band-tailed pigeon, Patagioenas fasciata
Pale-vented pigeon, Patagioenas cayennensis
Plumbeous pigeon, Patagioenas plumbea
Ruddy pigeon, Patagioenas subvinacea
Ruddy quail-dove, Geotrygon montana
Violaceous quail-dove, Geotrygon violacea
White-tipped dove, Leptotila verreauxi
Gray-fronted dove, Leptotila rufaxilla
Lined quail-dove, Zentrygon linearis
White-winged dove, Zenaida asiatica (V)
Eared dove, Zenaida auriculata
Blue ground dove, Claravis pretiosa
Maroon-chested ground dove, Paraclaravis mondetoura
Common ground dove, Columbina passerina
Plain-breasted ground dove, Columbina minuta
Ruddy ground dove, Columbina talpacoti
Scaled dove, Columbina squammata

Cuckoos
Order: CuculiformesFamily: Cuculidae

The family Cuculidae includes cuckoos, roadrunners, and anis. These birds are of variable size with slender bodies, long tails, and strong legs. Seventeen species have been recorded in Venezuela.

Greater ani, Crotophaga major
Smooth-billed ani, Crotophaga ani
Groove-billed ani, Crotophaga sulcirostris
Striped cuckoo, Tapera naevia
Pheasant cuckoo, Dromococcyx phasianellus
Pavonine cuckoo, Dromococcyx pavoninus
Rufous-winged ground-cuckoo, Neomorphus rufipennis
Little cuckoo, Coccycua minuta
Dwarf cuckoo, Coccycua pumila
Squirrel cuckoo, Piaya cayana
Black-bellied cuckoo, Piaya melanogaster
Dark-billed cuckoo, Coccyzus melacoryphus
Yellow-billed cuckoo, Coccyzus americanus
Pearly-breasted cuckoo, Coccyzus euleri
Mangrove cuckoo, Coccyzus minor
Black-billed cuckoo, Coccyzus erythropthalmus
Gray-capped cuckoo, Coccyzus lansbergi

Oilbird
Order: SteatornithiformesFamily: Steatornithidae

The oilbird is a slim, long-winged bird related to the nightjars. It is nocturnal and a specialist feeder on the fruit of the oil palm.

Oilbird, Steatornis caripensis

Potoos
Order: NyctibiiformesFamily: Nyctibiidae

The potoos (sometimes called poor-me-ones) are large near passerine birds related to the nightjars and frogmouths. They are nocturnal insectivores which lack the bristles around the mouth found in the true nightjars. Six species have been recorded in Venezuela.

Rufous potoo, Phyllaemulor bracteatus
Great potoo, Nyctibius grandis
Long-tailed potoo, Nyctibius aethereus
Common potoo, Nyctibius griseus
Andean potoo, Nyctibius maculosus
White-winged potoo, Nyctibius leucopterus

Nightjars
Order: CaprimulgiformesFamily: Caprimulgidae

Nightjars are medium-sized nocturnal birds that usually nest on the ground. They have long wings, short legs, and very short bills. Most have small feet, of little use for walking, and long pointed wings. Their soft plumage is camouflaged to resemble bark or leaves. Twenty species have been recorded in Venezuela.

Nacunda nighthawk, Chordeiles nacunda
Least nighthawk, Chordeiles pusillus
Sand-colored nighthawk, Chordeiles rupestris
Lesser nighthawk, Chordeiles acutipennis
Common nighthawk, Chordeiles minor
Antillean nighthawk, Chordeiles gundlachii (V)
Short-tailed nighthawk, Lurocalis semitorquatus
Rufous-bellied nighthawk, Lurocalis rufiventris
Band-tailed nighthawk, Nyctiprogne leucopyga (see note)
Blackish nightjar, Nyctipolus nigrescens
Band-winged nightjar, Systellura longirostris
Common pauraque, Nyctidromus albicollis
Lyre-tailed nightjar, Uropsalis lyra
Todd's nightjar, Setopagis heterura
Roraiman nightjar, Setopagis whitelyi
White-tailed nightjar, Hydropsalis cayennensis
Spot-tailed nightjar, Hydropsalis maculicaudus
Ladder-tailed nightjar, Hydropsalis climacocerca
Chuck-will's-widow, Antrostomus carolinensis
Rufous nightjar, Antrostomus rufus

Swifts
Order: ApodiformesFamily: Apodidae

Swifts are small birds which spend the majority of their lives flying. These birds have very short legs and never settle voluntarily on the ground, perching instead only on vertical surfaces. Many swifts have long swept-back wings which resemble a crescent or boomerang. Seventeen species have been recorded in Venezuela.

Spot-fronted swift, Cypseloides cherriei
White-chinned swift, Cypseloides cryptus
Chestnut-collared swift, Streptoprocne rutila
Tepui swift, Streptoprocne phelpsi
White-collared swift, Streptoprocne zonaris
Gray-rumped swift, Chaetura cinereiventris
Band-rumped swift, Chaetura spinicaudus
Chimney swift, Chaetura pelagica
Vaux's swift, Chaetura vauxi
Chapman's swift, Chaetura chapmani
Ashy-tailed swift, Chaetura andrei
Sick's swift, Chaetura meridionalis (H)
Short-tailed swift, Chaetura brachyura
White-tipped swift, Aeronautes montivagus
Pygmy palm swift, Tachornis furcata
Fork-tailed palm swift, Tachornis squamata
Lesser swallow-tailed swift, Panyptila cayennensis

Hummingbirds
Order: ApodiformesFamily: Trochilidae

Hummingbirds are small birds capable of hovering in mid-air due to the rapid flapping of their wings. They are the only birds that can fly backwards. One hundred species have been recorded in Venezuela.

Crimson topaz, Topaza pella
Fiery topaz, Topaza pyra
White-necked jacobin, Florisuga mellivora
White-tipped sicklebill, Eutoxeres aquila
Rufous-breasted hermit, Glaucis hirsutus
Band-tailed barbthroat, Threnetes ruckeri
Pale-tailed barbthroat, Threnetes leucurus
Streak-throated hermit, Phaethornis rupurumii
Little hermit, Phaethornis longuemareus
Stripe-throated hermit, Phaethornis striigularis
Gray-chinned hermit, Phaethornis griseogularis
Reddish hermit, Phaethornis ruber
Sooty-capped hermit, Phaethornis augusti
Pale-bellied hermit, Phaethornis anthophilus
White-bearded hermit, Phaethornis hispidus
Green hermit, Phaethornis guy
Straight-billed hermit, Phaethornis bourcieri
Long-billed hermit, Phaethornis longirostris
Long-tailed hermit, Phaethornis superciliosus
Great-billed hermit, Phaethornis malaris
Green-fronted lancebill, Doryfera ludovicae
Blue-fronted lancebill, Doryfera johannae
Geoffroy's daggerbill, Schistes geoffroyi
Brown violetear, Colibri delphinae
Lesser violetear, Colibri cyanotus
Sparkling violetear, Colibri coruscans
Black-eared fairy, Heliothryx auritus
White-tailed goldenthroat, Polytmus guainumbi
Tepui goldenthroat, Polytmus milleri (E)
Green-tailed goldenthroat, Polytmus theresiae
Fiery-tailed awlbill, Avocettula recurvirostris
Ruby-topaz hummingbird, Chrysolampis mosquitus
Green-throated mango, Anthracothorax viridigula
Green-breasted mango, Anthracothorax prevostii
Black-throated mango, Anthracothorax nigricollis
Orange-throated sunangel, Heliangelus mavors
Amethyst-throated sunangel, Heliangelus amethysticollis
Black-bellied thorntail, Discosura langsdorffi
Racket-tailed thorntail, Discosura longicaudus
Tufted coquette, Lophornis ornatus
Spangled coquette, Lophornis stictolophus
Butterfly coquette, Lophornis verreauxii
Peacock coquette, Lophornis pavoninus
Speckled hummingbird, Adelomyia melanogenys
Long-tailed sylph, Aglaiocercus kingii
Venezuelan sylph, Aglaiocercus berlepschi (E)
Purple-backed thornbill, Ramphomicron microrhynchum
White-bearded helmetcrest, Oxypogon lindenii (E)
Bronze-tailed thornbill, Chalcostigma heteropogon
Tyrian metaltail, Metallura tyrianthina
Perija metaltail, Metallura iracunda
Glowing puffleg, Eriocnemis vestita
Coppery-bellied puffleg, Eriocnemis cupreoventris
Bronzy inca, Coeligena coeligena
Collared inca, Coeligena torquata
Golden-bellied starfrontlet, Coeligena bonapartei
Blue-throated starfrontlet, Coeligena helianthea
Mountain velvetbreast, Lafresnaya lafresnayi
Sword-billed hummingbird, Ensifera ensifera
Great sapphirewing, Pterophanes cyanopterus (H)
Buff-tailed coronet, Boissonneaua flavescens
Booted racket-tail, Ocreatus underwoodii
Velvet-browed brilliant, Heliodoxa xanthogonys
Gould's jewelfront, Heliodoxa aurescens
Violet-fronted brilliant, Heliodoxa leadbeateri
Violet-chested hummingbird, Sternoclyta cyanopectus
Scissor-tailed hummingbird, Hylonympha macrocerca (E)
Long-billed starthroat, Heliomaster longirostris
Gorgeted woodstar, Chaetocercus heliodor
Rufous-shafted woodstar, Chaetocercus jourdanii
Amethyst woodstar, Calliphlox amethystina
Red-billed emerald, Chlorostilbon gibsoni
Blue-tailed emerald, Chlorostilbon mellisugus
Coppery emerald, Chlorostilbon russatus
Narrow-tailed emerald, Chlorostilbon stenurus
Green-tailed emerald, Chlorostilbon alice (E)
Short-tailed emerald, Chlorostilbon poortmani
Blue-chinned sapphire, Chlorestes notata
Violet-headed hummingbird, Klais guimeti
Gray-breasted sabrewing, Campylopterus largipennis
Rufous-breasted sabrewing, Campylopterus hyperythrus
White-tailed sabrewing, Campylopterus ensipennis
Lazuline sabrewing, Campylopterus falcatus
Buff-breasted sabrewing, Campylopterus duidae
White-vented plumeleteer, Chalybura buffonii
Crowned woodnymph, Thalurania colombica
Fork-tailed woodnymph, Thalurania furcata
Buffy hummingbird, Leucippus fallax
Steely-vented hummingbird, Saucerottia saucerottei
Green-bellied hummingbird, Saucerottia viridigaster
Copper-rumped hummingbird, Saucerottia tobaci
Rufous-tailed hummingbird, Amazilia tzacatl
Versicolored emerald, Chrysuronia versicolor
Golden-tailed sapphire, Chrysuronia oenone
Shining-green hummingbird, Chrysuronia goudoti
White-chested emerald, Chrysuronia brevirostris
Plain-bellied emerald, Chrysuronia leucogaster
Glittering-throated emerald, Chionomesa fimbriata
Sapphire-spangled emerald, Chionomesa lactea
Rufous-throated sapphire, Hylocharis sapphirina
White-chinned sapphire, Chlorestes cyanus

Hoatzin
Order: OpisthocomiformesFamily: Opisthocomidae

The Hoatzin is pheasant-sized, but much slimmer. It has a long tail and neck, but a small head with an unfeathered blue face and red eyes which are topped by a spiky crest. It is a weak flier which is found in the swamps of the Amazon and Orinoco rivers.

Hoatzin, Opisthocomus hoazin

Limpkin
Order: GruiformesFamily: Aramidae

The limpkin resembles a large rail. It has drab-brown plumage and a grayer head and neck.

Limpkin, Aramus guarauna

Trumpeters
Order: GruiformesFamily: Psophiidae

The trumpeters are dumpy birds with long necks and legs and chicken-like bills. They are named for the trumpeting call of the males. One species has been recorded in Venezuela.

Gray-winged trumpeter, Psophia crepitans

Rails
Order: GruiformesFamily: Rallidae

Rallidae is a large family of small to medium-sized birds which includes the rails, crakes, coots, and gallinules. Typically they inhabit dense vegetation in damp environments near lakes, swamps, or rivers. In general they are shy and secretive birds, making them difficult to observe. Most species have strong legs and long toes which are well adapted to soft uneven surfaces. They tend to have short, rounded wings and to be weak fliers. Twenty-two species have been recorded in Venezuela.

Mangrove rail, Rallus longirostris
Plain-flanked rail, Rallus wetmorei (E)
Purple gallinule, Porphyrio martinica
Azure gallinule, Porphyrio flavirostris
Russet-crowned crake, Anurolimnas viridis
Rusty-flanked crake, Laterallus levraudi (E)
Rufous-sided crake, Laterallus melanophaius
White-throated crake, Laterallus albigularis
Gray-breasted crake, Laterallus exilis
Speckled rail, Coturnicops notatus
Ocellated crake, Micropygia schomburgkii
Ash-throated crake, Mustelirallus albicollis
Paint-billed crake, Mustelirallus erythrops
Spotted rail, Pardirallus maculatus
Blackish rail, Pardirallus nigricans
Gray-cowled wood-rail, Aramides cajaneus
Rufous-necked wood-rail, Aramides axillaris
Uniform crake, Amaurolimnas concolor
Yellow-breasted crake, Hapalocrex flaviventer
Sora, Porzana carolina
Common gallinule, Gallinula galeata
American coot, Fulica americana

Finfoots
Order: GruiformesFamily: Heliornithidae

Heliornithidae is a small family of tropical birds with webbed lobes on their feet similar to those of grebes and coots. One species has been recorded in Venezuela.

Sungrebe, Heliornis fulica

Plovers
Order: CharadriiformesFamily: Charadriidae

The family Charadriidae includes the plovers, dotterels, and lapwings. They are small to medium-sized birds with compact bodies, short, thick necks, and long, usually pointed, wings. They are found in open country worldwide, mostly in habitats near water. Ten species have been recorded in Venezuela.

American golden-plover, Pluvialis dominica
Black-bellied plover, Pluvialis squatarola
Pied lapwing, Vanellus cayanus
Southern lapwing, Vanellus chilensis
Killdeer, Charadrius vociferus
Semipalmated plover, Charadrius semipalmatus
Piping plover, Charadrius melodus (V)
Wilson's plover, Charadrius wilsonia
Collared plover, Charadrius collaris
Snowy plover, Charadrius nivosus

Oystercatchers
Order: CharadriiformesFamily: Haematopodidae

The oystercatchers are large and noisy plover-like birds, with strong bills used for smashing or prising open molluscs. One species has been recorded in Venezuela.

American oystercatcher, Haematopus palliatus

Avocets and stilts
Order: CharadriiformesFamily: Recurvirostridae

Recurvirostridae is a family of large wading birds, which includes the avocets and stilts. The avocets have long legs and long up-curved bills. The stilts have extremely long legs and long, thin, straight bills. Two species have been recorded in Venezuela.

Black-necked stilt, Himantopus mexicanus
American avocet, Recurvirostra americana (H)

Thick-knees
Order: CharadriiformesFamily: Burhinidae

The thick-knees are a group of largely tropical waders in the family Burhinidae. They are found worldwide within the tropical zone, with some species also breeding in temperate Europe and Australia. They are medium to large waders with strong black or yellow-black bills, large yellow eyes, and cryptic plumage. Despite being classed as waders, most species have a preference for arid or semi-arid habitats. One species has been recorded in Venezuela.

Double-striped thick-knee, Burhinus bistriatus

Sandpiperss
Order: CharadriiformesFamily: Scolopacidae

Scolopacidae is a large diverse family of small to medium-sized shorebirds including the sandpipers, curlews, godwits, shanks, tattlers, woodcocks, snipes, dowitchers, and phalaropes. The majority of these species eat small invertebrates picked out of the mud or soil. Variation in length of legs and bills enables multiple species to feed in the same habitat, particularly on the coast, without direct competition for food. Thirty-three species have been recorded in Venezuela.

Upland sandpiper, Bartramia longicauda
Whimbrel, Numenius phaeopus
Long-billed curlew, Numenius americanus (V)
Bar-tailed godwit, Limosa lapponica (V)
Hudsonian godwit, Limosa haemastica
Marbled godwit, Limosa fedoa
Ruddy turnstone, Arenaria interpres
Red knot, Calidris canutus
Ruff, Calidris pugnax (H)
Stilt sandpiper, Calidris himantopus
Sanderling, Calidris alba
Dunlin, Calidris alpina (H)
Baird's sandpiper, Calidris bairdii (V)
Least sandpiper, Calidris minutilla
White-rumped sandpiper, Calidris fuscicollis
Buff-breasted sandpiper, Calidris subruficollis
Pectoral sandpiper, Calidris melanotos
Semipalmated sandpiper, Calidris pusilla
Western sandpiper, Calidris mauri
Short-billed dowitcher, Limnodromus griseus
Long-billed dowitcher, Limnodromus scolopaceus (V)
Jameson's snipe, Gallinago jamesoni
Noble snipe, Gallinago nobilis
Giant snipe, Gallinago undulata
Wilson's snipe, Gallinago delicata
Pantanal snipe, Gallinago paraguaiae
Wilson's phalarope, Phalaropus tricolor
Red-necked phalarope, Phalaropus lobatus (V)
Spotted sandpiper, Actitis macularius
Solitary sandpiper, Tringa solitaria
Greater yellowlegs, Tringa melanoleuca
Willet, Tringa semipalmata
Lesser yellowlegs, Tringa flavipes

Jacanas
Order: CharadriiformesFamily: Jacanidae

The jacanas are a group of waders found throughout the tropics. They are identifiable by their huge feet and claws which enable them to walk on floating vegetation in the shallow lakes that are their preferred habitat. One species has been recorded in Venezuela.

Wattled jacana, Jacana jacana

Skuas
Order: CharadriiformesFamily: Stercorariidae

The family Stercorariidae are, in general, medium to large birds, typically with gray or brown plumage, often with white markings on the wings. They nest on the ground in temperate and arctic regions and are long-distance migrants. Five species have been recorded in Venezuela.

Great skua, Stercorarius skua (H)
South polar skua, Stercorarius maccormicki (V)
Pomarine jaeger, Stercorarius pomarinus
Parasitic jaeger, Stercorarius parasiticus
Long-tailed jaeger, Stercorarius longicaudus (H)

Skimmers
Order: CharadriiformesFamily: Rynchopidae

Skimmers are a small family of tropical tern-like birds. They have an elongated lower mandible which they use to feed by flying low over the water surface and skimming the water for small fish. One species has been recorded in Venezuela.

Black skimmer, Rynchops niger

Gulls
Order: CharadriiformesFamily: Laridae

Laridae is a family of medium to large seabirds and includes gulls, kittiwakes, and terns. Gulls are typically gray or white, often with black markings on the head or wings. They have stout, longish bills and webbed feet. Terns are a group of generally medium to large seabirds typically with gray or white plumage, often with black markings on the head. Most terns hunt fish by diving but some pick insects off the surface of fresh water. Terns are generally long-lived birds, with several species known to live in excess of 30 years. Twenty-two species have been recorded in Venezuela.

Black-legged kittiwake, Rissa tridactyla (V)
Black-headed gull, Chroicocephalus ridibundus
Laughing gull, Leucophaeus atricilla
Franklin's gull, Leucophaeus pipixcan (V)
Ring-billed gull, Larus delawarensis (V)
Kelp gull, Larus dominicanus (V)
Lesser black-backed gull, Larus fuscus (V)
Herring gull, Larus argentatus (V)
Brown noddy, Anous stolidus
Black noddy, Anous minutus
Sooty tern, Onychoprion fuscatus
Bridled tern, Onychoprion anaethetus
Least tern, Sternula antillarum
Yellow-billed tern, Sternula superciliaris
Large-billed tern, Phaetusa simplex
Gull-billed tern, Gelochelidon nilotica
Caspian tern, Hydroprogne caspia
Black tern, Chlidonias niger
Common tern, Sterna hirundo
Roseate tern, Sterna dougallii
Sandwich tern, Thalasseus sandvicensis
Royal tern, Thalasseus maximus

Sunbittern
Order: EurypygiformesFamily: Eurypygidae

The sunbittern is a bittern-like bird of tropical regions of the Americas and the sole member of the family Eurypygidae (sometimes spelled Eurypigidae) and genus Eurypyga.

Sunbittern, Eurypyga helias

Tropicbirds
Order: PhaethontiformesFamily: Phaethontidae

Tropicbirds are slender white birds of tropical oceans with exceptionally long central tail feathers. Their heads and long wings have black markings. Two species have been recorded in Venezuela.

Red-billed tropicbird, Phaethon aethereus
White-tailed tropicbird, Phaethon lepturus (H)

Albatrosses
Order: ProcellariiformesFamily: Diomedeidae

The albatrosses are among the largest of flying birds, and the great albatrosses from the genus Diomedea have the largest wingspans of any extant birds. One species has been recorded in Venezuela.

Yellow-nosed albatross, Thalassarche chlororhynchos (V)

Southern storm-petrels
Order: ProcellariiformesFamily: Oceanitidae

The storm-petrels are the smallest seabirds, relatives of the petrels, feeding on planktonic crustaceans and small fish picked from the surface, typically while hovering. The flight is fluttering and sometimes bat-like. Until 2018, this family's species were included with the other storm-petrels in family Hydrobatidae. One species has been recorded in Venezuela.

Wilson's storm-petrel, Oceanites oceanicus

Northern storm-petrels
Order: ProcellariiformesFamily: Hydrobatidae

Though the members of this family are similar in many respects to the southern storm-petrels, including their general appearance and habits, there are enough genetic differences to warrant their placement in a separate family. One species has been recorded in Venezuela.

Leach's storm-petrel, Hydrobates leucorhoa

Shearwaters and petrels
Order: ProcellariiformesFamily: Procellariidae

The procellariids are the main group of medium-sized "true petrels", characterized by united nostrils with medium septum and a long outer functional primary. Four species have been recorded in Venezuela.

Black-capped petrel, Pterodroma hasitata (H)
Cory's shearwater, Calonectris diomedea (H)
Great shearwater, Ardenna gravis
Audubon's shearwater, Puffinus lherminieri

Storks
Order: CiconiiformesFamily: Ciconiidae

Storks are large, long-legged, long-necked, wading birds with long, stout bills. Storks are mute, but bill-clattering is an important mode of communication at the nest. Their nests can be large and may be reused for many years. Many species are migratory. Three species have been recorded in Venezuela.

Maguari stork, Ciconia maguari
Jabiru, Jabiru mycteria
Wood stork, Mycteria americana

Frigatebirds
Order: SuliformesFamily: Fregatidae

Frigatebirds are large seabirds usually found over tropical oceans. They are large, black-and-white, or completely black, with long wings and deeply forked tails. The males have colored inflatable throat pouches. They do not swim or walk and cannot take off from a flat surface. Having the largest wingspan-to-body-weight ratio of any bird, they are essentially aerial, able to stay aloft for more than a week. One species has been recorded in Venezuela.

Magnificent frigatebird, Fregata magnificens

Boobies
Order: SuliformesFamily: Sulidae

The sulids comprise the gannets and boobies. Both groups are medium to large coastal seabirds that plunge-dive for fish. Three species have been recorded in Venezuela.

Masked booby, Sula dactylatra
Red-footed booby, Sula sula
Brown booby, Sula leucogaster

Anhingas
Order: SuliformesFamily: Anhingidae

Anhingas are often called "snake-birds" because of their long thin neck, which gives a snake-like appearance when they swim with their bodies submerged. The males have black and dark-brown plumage, an erectile crest on the nape, and a larger bill than the female. The females have much paler plumage especially on the neck and underparts. The darters have completely webbed feet and their legs are short and set far back on the body. Their plumage is somewhat permeable, like that of cormorants, and they spread their wings to dry after diving. One species has been recorded in Venezuela.

Anhinga, Anhinga anhinga

Cormorants
Order: SuliformesFamily: Phalacrocoracidae

Phalacrocoracidae is a family of medium to large coastal, fish-eating seabirds that includes cormorants and shags. Plumage coloration varies, with the majority having mainly dark plumage, some species being black-and-white, and a few being colorful. One species has been recorded in Venezuela.

Neotropic cormorant, Phalacrocorax brasilianus

Pelicans
Order: PelecaniformesFamily: Pelecanidae

Pelicans are large water birds with a distinctive pouch under their beak. As with other members of the order Pelecaniformes, they have webbed feet with four toes. One species has been recorded in Venezuela.

Brown pelican, Pelecanus occidentalis

Herons
Order: PelecaniformesFamily: Ardeidae

The family Ardeidae contains the bitterns, herons, and egrets. Herons and egrets are medium to large wading birds with long necks and legs. Bitterns tend to be shorter necked and more wary. Members of Ardeidae fly with their necks retracted, unlike other long-necked birds such as storks, ibises, and spoonbills. Twenty-two species have been recorded in Venezuela.

Rufescent tiger-heron, Tigrisoma lineatum
Fasciated tiger-heron, Tigrisoma fasciatum
Agami heron, Agamia agami
Boat-billed heron, Cochlearius cochlearius
Zigzag heron, Zebrilus undulatus
Pinnated bittern, Botaurus pinnatus
Least bittern, Ixobrychus exilis
Stripe-backed bittern, Ixobrychus involucris
Black-crowned night-heron, Nycticorax nycticorax
Yellow-crowned night-heron, Nyctanassa violacea
Green heron, Butorides virescens
Striated heron, Butorides striata
Cattle egret, Bubulcus ibis
Great blue heron, Ardea herodias
Cocoi heron, Ardea cocoi
Great egret, Ardea alba
Whistling heron, Syrigma sibilatrix
Capped heron, Pilherodius pileatus
Tricolored heron, Egretta tricolor
Reddish egret, Egretta rufescens
Snowy egret, Egretta thula
Little blue heron, Egretta caerulea

Ibises
Order: PelecaniformesFamily: Threskiornithidae

Threskiornithidae is a family of large terrestrial and wading birds which includes the ibises and spoonbills. They have long, broad wings with 11 primary and about 20 secondary feathers. They are strong fliers and despite their size and weight, very capable soarers. Eight species have been recorded in Venezuela.

White ibis, Eudocimus albus
Scarlet ibis, Eudocimus ruber
Glossy ibis, Plegadis falcinellus
Sharp-tailed ibis, Cercibis oxycerca
Green ibis, Mesembrinibis cayennensis
Bare-faced ibis, Phimosus infuscatus
Buff-necked ibis, Theristicus caudatus
Roseate spoonbill, Platalea ajaja

New World vultures
Order: CathartiformesFamily: Cathartidae

The New World vultures are not closely related to Old World vultures, but superficially resemble them because of convergent evolution. Like the Old World vultures, they are scavengers. However, unlike Old World vultures, which find carcasses by sight, New World vultures have a good sense of smell with which they locate carrion. Six species have been recorded in Venezuela.

King vulture, Sarcoramphus papa
Andean condor, Vultur gryphus
Black vulture, Coragyps atratus
Turkey vulture, Cathartes aura
Lesser yellow-headed vulture, Cathartes burrovianus
Greater yellow-headed vulture, Cathartes melambrotus

Osprey
Order: AccipitriformesFamily: Pandionidae

The family Pandionidae contains only one species, the osprey. The osprey is a medium-large raptor which is a specialist fish-eater with a worldwide distribution.

Osprey, Pandion haliaetus

Hawks
Order: AccipitriformesFamily: Accipitridae

Accipitridae is a family of birds of prey which includes hawks, eagles, kites, harriers, and Old World vultures. These birds have powerful hooked beaks for tearing flesh from their prey, strong legs, powerful talons, and keen eyesight. Forty-five species have been recorded in Venezuela.

Pearl kite, Gampsonyx swainsonii
White-tailed kite, Elanus leucurus
Hook-billed kite, Chondrohierax uncinatus
Gray-headed kite, Leptodon cayanensis
Swallow-tailed kite, Elanoides forficatus
Crested eagle, Morphnus guianensis
Harpy eagle, Harpia harpyja
Black hawk-eagle, Spizaetus tyrannus
Black-and-white hawk-eagle, Spizaetus melanoleucus
Ornate hawk-eagle, Spizaetus ornatus
Black-and-chestnut eagle, Spizaetus isidori
Black-collared hawk, Busarellus nigricollis
Snail kite, Rostrhamus sociabilis
Slender-billed kite, Helicolestes hamatus
Double-toothed kite, Harpagus bidentatus
Rufous-thighed kite, Harpagus diodon (V)
Mississippi kite, Ictinia mississippiensis (V)
Plumbeous kite, Ictinia plumbea
Northern harrier, Circus hudsonius
Long-winged harrier, Circus buffoni
Gray-bellied hawk, Accipiter poliogaster
Sharp-shinned hawk, Accipiter striatus
Bicolored hawk, Accipiter bicolor
Tiny hawk, Microspizias superciliosus
Semicollared hawk, Microspizias collaris
Crane hawk, Geranospiza caerulescens
Slate-colored hawk, Buteogallus schistaceus
Common black hawk, Buteogallus anthracinus
Rufous crab hawk, Buteogallus aequinoctialis
Savanna hawk, Buteogallus meridionalis
Great black hawk, Buteogallus urubitinga
Solitary eagle, Buteogallus solitarius
Roadside hawk, Rupornis magnirostris
Harris's hawk, Parabuteo unicinctus
White-rumped hawk, Parabuteo leucorrhous
White-tailed hawk, Geranoaetus albicaudatus
Black-chested buzzard-eagle, Geranoaetus melanoleucus
White hawk, Pseudastur albicollis
Black-faced hawk, Leucopternis melanops
Gray-lined hawk, Buteo nitidus
Broad-winged hawk, Buteo platypterus
White-throated hawk, Buteo albigula
Short-tailed hawk, Buteo brachyurus
Swainson's hawk, Buteo swainsoni
Zone-tailed hawk, Buteo albonotatus

Barn owls
Order: StrigiformesFamily: Tytonidae

Barn owls are medium to large owls with large heads and characteristic heart-shaped faces. They have long strong legs with powerful talons. One species has been recorded in Venezuela.

Barn owl, Tyto alba

Owls
Order: StrigiformesFamily: Strigidae

The typical owls are small to large solitary nocturnal birds of prey. They have large forward-facing eyes and ears, a hawk-like beak, and a conspicuous circle of feathers around each eye called a facial disk. Twenty-one species have been recorded in Venezuela.

White-throated screech-owl, Megascops albogularis
Tropical screech-owl, Megascops choliba
Rufescent screech-owl, Megascops ingens
Cinnamon screech-owl, Megascops petersoni
Foothill screech-owl, Megascops roraimae
Tawny-bellied screech-owl, Megascops watsonii
Crested owl, Lophostrix cristata
Spectacled owl, Pulsatrix perspicillata
Great horned owl, Bubo virginianus
Mottled owl, Strix virgata
Black-and-white owl, Strix nigrolineata
Black-banded owl, Strix huhula
Rufous-banded owl, Strix albitarsis
Andean pygmy-owl, Glaucidium jardinii
Amazonian pygmy-owl, Glaucidium hardyi
Ferruginous pygmy-owl, Glaucidium brasilianum
Burrowing owl, Athene cunicularia
Buff-fronted owl, Aegolius harrisii
Striped owl, Asio clamator
Stygian owl, Asio stygius
Short-eared owl, Asio flammeus

Trogons
Order: TrogoniformesFamily: Trogonidae

The family Trogonidae includes trogons and quetzals. Found in tropical woodlands worldwide, they feed on insects and fruit, and their broad bills and weak legs reflect their diet and arboreal habits. Although their flight is fast, they are reluctant to fly any distance. Trogons have soft, often colorful, feathers with distinctive male and female plumage. Twelve species have been recorded Venezuela.

Pavonine quetzal, Pharomachrus pavoninus
Golden-headed quetzal, Pharomachrus auriceps
White-tipped quetzal, Pharomachrus fulgidus
Crested quetzal, Pharomachrus antisianus
Black-tailed trogon, Trogon melanurus
Green-backed trogon, Trogon viridis
Gartered trogon, Trogon caligatus
Amazonian trogon, Trogon ramonianus
Guianan trogon, Trogon violaceus
Black-throated trogon, Trogon rufus (see note)
Collared trogon, Trogon collaris
Masked trogon, Trogon personatus

Motmots
Order: CoraciiformesFamily: Momotidae

The motmots have colorful plumage and long, graduated tails which they display by waggling back and forth. In most of the species, the barbs near the ends of the two longest (central) tail feathers are weak and fall off, leaving a length of bare shaft and creating a racket-shaped tail. Two species have been recorded in Venezuela.

Whooping motmot, Momotus subrufescens
Amazonian motmot, Momotus momota

Kingfishers
Order: CoraciiformesFamily: Alcedinidae

Kingfishers are medium-sized birds with large heads, long, pointed bills, short legs, and stubby tails. Six species have been recorded in Venezuela.

Ringed kingfisher, Megaceryle torquata
Belted kingfisher, Megaceryle alcyon
Amazon kingfisher, Chloroceryle amazona
American pygmy kingfisher, Chloroceryle aenea
Green kingfisher, Chloroceryle americana
Green-and-rufous kingfisher, Chloroceryle inda

Jacamars
Order: GalbuliformesFamily: Galbulidae

The jacamars are near passerine birds from tropical South America, with a range that extends up to Mexico. They feed on insects caught on the wing, and are glossy, elegant birds with long bills and tails. In appearance and behavior they resemble the Old World bee-eaters, although they are more closely related to puffbirds. Eight species have been recorded in Venezuela.

Brown jacamar, Brachygalba lugubris
Pale-headed jacamar, Brachygalba goeringi
Yellow-billed jacamar, Galbula albirostris
Rufous-tailed jacamar, Galbula ruficauda
Green-tailed jacamar, Galbula galbula
Bronzy jacamar, Galbula leucogastra
Paradise jacamar, Galbula dea
Great jacamar, Jacamerops aureus

Puffbirds
Order: GalbuliformesFamily: Bucconidae

The puffbirds are related to the jacamars and have the same range, but lack the iridescent colors of that family. They are mainly brown, rufous, or gray, with large heads and flattened bills with hooked tips. The loose abundant plumage and short tails makes them look stout and puffy, giving rise to the English common name of the family. Fourteen species have been recorded in Venezuela.

White-necked puffbird, Notharchus hyperrhynchus
Guianan puffbird, Notharchus macrorhynchos
Brown-banded puffbird, Notharchus ordii
Pied puffbird, Notharchus tectus
Chestnut-capped puffbird, Bucco macrodactylus
Spotted puffbird, Bucco tamatia
Collared puffbird, Bucco capensis
Russet-throated puffbird, Hypnelus ruficollis
White-chested puffbird, Malacoptila fusca
Moustached puffbird, Malacoptila mystacalis
Rusty-breasted nunlet, Nonnula rubecula
Black nunbird, Monasa atra
White-fronted nunbird, Monasa morphoeus
Swallow-winged puffbird, Chelidoptera tenebrosa

New World barbets
Order: PiciformesFamily: Capitonidae

The barbets are plump birds, with short necks and large heads. They get their name from the bristles which fringe their heavy bills. Most species are brightly colored. Three species have been recorded in Venezuela.

Black-spotted barbet, Capito niger
Gilded barbet, Capito auratus
Red-headed barbet, Eubucco bourcierii

Toucans
Order: PiciformesFamily: Ramphastidae

Toucans are near passerine birds from the Neotropics. They are brightly marked and have enormous, colorful bills which in some species amount to half their body length. Sixteen species have been recorded in Venezuela.

Yellow-throated toucan, Ramphastos ambiguus
White-throated toucan, Ramphastos tucanus
Keel-billed toucan, Ramphastos sulfuratus
Channel-billed toucan, Ramphastos vitellinus
Southern emerald-toucanet, Aulacorhynchus albivitta
Groove-billed toucanet, Aulacorhynchus sulcatus
Tepui toucanet, Aulacorhynchus whitelianus
Crimson-rumped toucanet, Aulacorhynchus haematopygus
Black-billed mountain-toucan, Andigena nigrirostris
Guianan toucanet, Selenidera culik
Tawny-tufted toucanet, Selenidera nattereri
Green aracari, Pteroglossus viridis
Collared aracari, Pteroglossus torquatus
Black-necked aracari, Pteroglossus aracari
Many-banded aracari, Pteroglossus pluricinctus
Ivory-billed aracari, Pteroglossus azara

Woodpeckers
Order: PiciformesFamily: Picidae

Woodpeckers are small to medium-sized birds with chisel-like beaks, short legs, stiff tails, and long tongues used for capturing insects. Some species have feet with two toes pointing forward and two backward, while several species have only three toes. Many woodpeckers have the habit of tapping noisily on tree trunks with their beaks. Twenty-seven species have been recorded in Venezuela.

Golden-spangled piculet, Picumnus exilis
Scaled piculet, Picumnus squamulatus
White-bellied piculet, Picumnus spilogaster
Olivaceous piculet, Picumnus olivaceus
Chestnut piculet, Picumnus cinnamomeus
Yellow-tufted woodpecker, Melanerpes cruentatus
Red-crowned woodpecker, Melanerpes rubricapillus
Smoky-brown woodpecker, Dryobates fumigatus
Red-rumped woodpecker, Dryobates kirkii
Golden-collared woodpecker, Dryobates cassini
Little woodpecker, Dryobates passerinus
Yellow-vented woodpecker, Dryobates dignus
Red-stained woodpecker, Dryobates affinis
Powerful woodpecker, Campephilus pollens
Red-necked woodpecker, Campephilus rubricollis
Crimson-crested woodpecker, Campephilus melanoleucos
Lineated woodpecker, Dryocopus lineatus
Ringed woodpecker, Celeus torquatus
Scale-breasted woodpecker, Celeus grammicus
Waved woodpecker, Celeus undatus
Cream-colored woodpecker, Celeus flavus
Chestnut woodpecker, Celeus elegans
Yellow-throated woodpecker, Piculus flavigula
Golden-green woodpecker, Piculus chrysochloros
Golden-olive woodpecker, Colaptes rubiginosus
Crimson-mantled woodpecker, Colaptes rivolii
Spot-breasted woodpecker, Colaptes punctigula

Falcons
Order: FalconiformesFamily: Falconidae

Falconidae is a family of diurnal birds of prey. They differ from hawks, eagles, and kites in that they kill with their beaks instead of their talons. Sixteen species have been recorded in Venezuela.

Laughing falcon, Herpetotheres cachinnans
Barred forest-falcon, Micrastur ruficollis
Lined forest-falcon, Micrastur gilvicollis
Slaty-backed forest-falcon, Micrastur mirandollei
Collared forest-falcon, Micrastur semitorquatus
Buckley's forest-falcon, Micrastur buckleyi (H)
Crested caracara, Caracara plancus
Red-throated caracara, Ibycter americanus
Black caracara, Daptrius ater
Yellow-headed caracara, Milvago chimachima
American kestrel, Falco sparverius
Merlin, Falco columbarius
Bat falcon, Falco rufigularis
Orange-breasted falcon, Falco deiroleucus
Aplomado falcon, Falco femoralis
Peregrine falcon, Falco peregrinus

Old World parrots
Order: PsittaciformesFamily: Psittaculidae.

Characteristic features of parrots include a strong curved bill, an upright stance, strong legs, and clawed zygodactyl feet. Many parrots are vividly colored, and some are multi-colored. Old World parrots are found from Africa east across south and southeast Asia and Oceania to Australia and New Zealand. One species has been recorded in Venezuela.

Rose-ringed parakeet, Psittacula krameri (I)

New World and African parrots
Order: PsittaciformesFamily: Psittacidae.

Parrots are small to large birds with a characteristic curved beak. Their upper mandibles have slight mobility in the joint with the skull and they have a generally erect stance. All parrots are zygodactyl, having the four toes on each foot placed two at the front and two to the back. Forty-seven species have been recorded in Venezuela.

Lilac-tailed parrotlet, Touit batavicus
Scarlet-shouldered parrotlet, Touit huetii
Blue-fronted parrotlet, Touit dilectissimus
Sapphire-rumped parrotlet, Touit purpuratus
Barred parakeet, Bolborhynchus lineola
Tepui parrotlet, Nannopsittaca panychlora
Orange-chinned parakeet, Brotogeris jugularis
Cobalt-winged parakeet, Brotogeris cyanoptera
Golden-winged parakeet, Brotogeris chrysoptera
Rusty-faced parrot, Hapalopsittaca amazonina
Saffron-headed parrot, Pyrilia pyrilia
Orange-cheeked parrot, Pyrilia barrabandi
Caica parrot, Pyrilia caica
Dusky parrot, Pionus fuscus
Red-billed parrot, Pionus sordidus
Speckle-faced parrot, Pionus tumultuosus
Blue-headed parrot, Pionus menstruus
Bronze-winged parrot, Pionus chalcopterus
Festive parrot, Amazona festiva
Red-lored parrot, Amazona autumnalis
Blue-cheeked parrot, Amazona dufresniana
Yellow-crowned parrot, Amazona ochrocephala
Yellow-shouldered parrot, Amazona barbadensis
Mealy parrot, Amazona farinosa
Orange-winged parrot, Amazona amazonica
Scaly-naped parrot, Amazona mercenarius
Dusky-billed parrotlet, Forpus modestus
Spectacled parrotlet, Forpus conspicillatus
Green-rumped parrotlet, Forpus passerinus
Black-headed parrot, Pionites melanocephalus
Red-fan parrot, Deroptyus accipitrinus
Painted parakeet, Pyrrhura picta
Fiery-shouldered parakeet, Pyrrhura egregia
Maroon-tailed parakeet, Pyrrhura melanura
Red-eared parakeet, Pyrrhura hoematotis (E)
Rose-headed parakeet, Pyrrhura rhodocephala (E)
Brown-throated parakeet, Eupsittula pertinax
Red-bellied macaw, Orthopsittaca manilatus
Blue-and-yellow macaw, Ara ararauna
Chestnut-fronted macaw, Ara severus
Military macaw, Ara militaris
Scarlet macaw, Ara macao
Red-and-green macaw, Ara chloropterus
Blue-crowned parakeet, Thectocercus acuticaudatus
Red-shouldered macaw, Diopsittaca nobilis
Scarlet-fronted parakeet, Psittacara wagleri
White-eyed parakeet, Psittacara leucophthalmus

Antbirds
Order: PasseriformesFamily: Thamnophilidae

The antbirds are a large family of small passerine birds of subtropical and tropical Central and South America. They are forest birds which tend to feed on insects at or near the ground. A sizable minority of them specialize in following columns of army ants to eat small invertebrates that leave their hiding places to flee from the ants. Many species lack bright color; brown, black, and white being the dominant tones. Seventy-one species have been recorded in Venezuela.

Rufous-rumped antwren, Euchrepomis callinota
Ash-winged antwren, Euchrepomis spodioptila
Fasciated antshrike, Cymbilaimus lineatus
Black-throated antshrike, Frederickena viridis
Great antshrike, Taraba major
Black-crested antshrike, Sakesphorus canadensis
Barred antshrike, Thamnophilus doliatus
Bar-crested antshrike, Thamnophilus multistriatus
Black-crowned antshrike, Thamnophilus atrinucha
Mouse-colored antshrike, Thamnophilus murinus
Blackish-gray antshrike, Thamnophilus nigrocinereus
Northern slaty-antshrike, Thamnophilus punctatus
White-shouldered antshrike, Thamnophilus aethiops
Black-backed antshrike, Thamnophilus melanonotus
Amazonian antshrike, Thamnophilus amazonicus
Streak-backed antshrike, Thamnophilus insignis
Pearly antshrike, Megastictus margaritatus
Recurve-billed bushbird, Clytoctantes alixii
Russet antshrike, Thamnistes anabatinus
Plain antvireo, Dysithamnus mentalis
White-streaked antvireo, Dysithamnus leucostictus
Spot-tailed antwren, Herpsilochmus sticturus
Todd's antwren, Herpsilochmus stictocephalus
Spot-backed antwren, Herpsilochmus dorsimaculatus
Roraiman antwren, Herpsilochmus roraimae
Rufous-margined antwren, Herpsilochmus frater
Dusky-throated antshrike, Thamnomanes ardesiacus
Cinereous antshrike, Thamnomanes caesius
Rufous-bellied antwren, Isleria guttata
Spot-winged antshrike, Pygiptila stellaris
Brown-bellied stipplethroat, Epinecrophylla gutturalis
Rufous-backed stipplethroat, Epinecrophylla haematonota
Pygmy antwren, Myrmotherula brachyura
Yellow-throated antwren, Myrmotherula ambigua
Guianan streaked-antwren, Myrmotherula surinamensis
Amazonian streaked-antwren, Myrmotherula multostriata
Cherrie's antwren, Myrmotherula cherriei
White-flanked antwren, Myrmotherula axillaris
Slaty antwren, Myrmotherula schisticolor
Long-winged antwren, Myrmotherula longipennis
Plain-winged antwren, Myrmotherula behni
Gray antwren, Myrmotherula menetriesii
Banded antbird, Dichrozona cincta
White-fringed antwren, Formicivora grisea
Klages's antbird, Drymophila klagesi
Guianan warbling-antbird, Hypocnemis cantator
Imeri warbling-antbird, Hypocnemis flavescens
Dusky antbird, Cercomacroides tyrannina
Gray antbird, Cercomacra cinerascens
Jet antbird, Cercomacra nigricans
White-browed antbird, Myrmoborus leucophrys
Black-faced antbird, Myrmoborus myotherinus
Black-chinned antbird, Hypocnemoides melanopogon
Silvered antbird, Sclateria naevia
Black-headed antbird, Percnostola rufifrons
Roraiman antbird, Myrmelastes saturatus
Spot-winged antbird, Myrmelastes leucostigma
Caura antbird, Myrmelastes caurensis
White-bellied antbird, Myrmeciza longipes
Magdalena antbird, Sipia palliata
Ferruginous-backed antbird, Myrmoderus ferrugineus
Blue-lored antbird, Hafferia immaculata
Yapacana antbird, Aprositornis disjuncta
Black-throated antbird, Myrmophylax atrothorax
Gray-bellied antbird, Ammonastes pelzelni
Wing-banded antbird, Myrmornis torquata
White-plumed antbird, Pithys albifrons
Rufous-throated antbird, Gymnopithys rufigula
Spot-backed antbird, Hylophylax naevius
Dot-backed antbird, Hylophylax punctulatus
Common scale-backed antbird, Willisornis poecilinotus
Reddish-winged bare-eye, Phlegopsis erythroptera

Antpittas
Order: PasseriformesFamily: Grallariidae

Antpittas resemble the true pittas with strong, longish legs, very short tails, and stout bills. Eighteen species have been recorded in Venezuela.

Undulated antpitta, Grallaria squamigera
Great antpitta, Grallaria excelsa (E)
Variegated antpitta, Grallaria varia
Scaled antpitta, Grallaria guatimalensis
Tachira antpitta, Grallaria chthonia (E)
Plain-backed antpitta, Grallaria haplonota
Chestnut-crowned antpitta, Grallaria ruficapilla
Gray-naped antpitta, Grallaria griseonucha (E)
Perija antpitta, Grallaria saltuensis
Muisca antpitta, Grallaria rufula
Scallop-breasted antpitta, Grallaricula loricata (E)
Hooded antpitta, Grallaricula cucullata
Rusty-breasted antpitta, Grallaricula ferrugineipectus
Slate-crowned antpitta, Grallaricula nana
Sucre antpitta, Grallaricula cumanensis (E)
Spotted antpitta, Hylopezus macularius
Thrush-like antpitta, Myrmothera campanisona
Tepui antpitta, Myrmothera simplex

Tapaculos
Order: PasseriformesFamily: Rhinocryptidae

The tapaculos are small suboscine passeriform birds with numerous species in South and Central America. They are terrestrial species that fly only poorly on their short wings. They have strong legs, well-suited to their habitat of grassland or forest undergrowth. The tail is cocked and pointed towards the head. Eight species have been recorded in Venezuela.

Ocellated tapaculo, Acropternis orthonyx
Ash-colored tapaculo, Myornis senilis
White-crowned tapaculo, Scytalopus atratus
Blackish tapaculo, Scytalopus latrans
Caracas tapaculo, Scytalopus caracae (E)
Pale-bellied tapaculo, Scytalopus griseicollis
Perija tapaculo, Scytalopus perijanus
Merida tapaculo, Scytalopus meridanus (E)

Antthrushes
Order: PasseriformesFamily: Formicariidae

The ground antbirds are a group comprising the antthrushes and antpittas. Antthrushes resemble small rails while antpittas resemble the true pittas with strong, longish legs, very short tails, and stout bills. Five species have been recorded in Venezuela.

Rufous-capped antthrush, Formicarius colma
Black-faced antthrush, Formicarius analis
Rufous-breasted antthrush, Formicarius rufipectus
Short-tailed antthrush, Chamaeza campanisona
Schwartz's antthrush, Chamaeza turdina

Ovenbirds
Order: PasseriformesFamily: Furnariidae

Ovenbirds comprise a large family of small sub-oscine passerine bird species found in Central and South America. They are a diverse group of insectivores which gets its name from the elaborate "oven-like" clay nests built by some species, although others build stick nests or nest in tunnels or clefts in rock. The woodcreepers are brownish birds which maintain an upright vertical posture, supported by their stiff tail vanes. They feed mainly on insects taken from tree trunks. Eighty-eight species have been recorded in Venezuela.

South American leaftosser, Sclerurus obscurior
Short-billed leaftosser, Sclerurus rufigularis
Black-tailed leaftosser, Sclerurus caudacutus
Gray-throated leaftosser, Sclerurus albigularis
Spot-throated woodcreeper, Certhiasomus stictolaemus
Olivaceous woodcreeper, Sittasomus griseicapillus
Long-tailed woodcreeper, Deconychura longicauda
Tyrannine woodcreeper, Dendrocincla tyrannina
White-chinned woodcreeper, Dendrocincla merula
Ruddy woodcreeper, Dendrocincla homochroa
Plain-brown woodcreeper, Dendrocincla fuliginosa
Wedge-billed woodcreeper, Glyphorynchus spirurus
Cinnamon-throated woodcreeper, Dendrexetastes rufigula
Long-billed woodcreeper, Nasica longirostris
Northern barred-woodcreeper, Dendrocolaptes sanctithomae
Amazonian barred-woodcreeper, Dendrocolaptes certhia
Black-banded woodcreeper, Dendrocolaptes picumnus
Red-billed woodcreeper, Hylexetastes perrotii
Strong-billed woodcreeper, Xiphocolaptes promeropirhynchus
Striped woodcreeper, Xiphorhynchus obsoletus
Chestnut-rumped woodcreeper, Xiphorhynchus pardalotus
Ocellated woodcreeper, Xiphorhynchus ocellatus
Cocoa woodcreeper, Xiphorhynchus susurrans
Buff-throated woodcreeper, Xiphorhynchus guttatus
Olive-backed woodcreeper, Xiphorhynchus triangularis
Straight-billed woodcreeper, Dendroplex picus
Red-billed scythebill, Campylorhamphus trochilirostris
Curve-billed scythebill, Campylorhamphus procurvoides
Brown-billed scythebill, Campylorhamphus pusillus
Streak-headed woodcreeper, Lepidocolaptes souleyetii
Montane woodcreeper, Lepidocolaptes lacrymiger
Duida woodcreeper, Lepidocolaptes duidae
Guianan woodcreeper, Lepidocolaptes albolineatus
Slender-billed xenops, Xenops tenuirostris
Plain xenops, Xenops minutus
Streaked xenops, Xenops rutilans
Point-tailed palmcreeper, Berlepschia rikeri
Rufous-tailed xenops, Microxenops milleri
Streaked tuftedcheek, Pseudocolaptes boissonneautii
Rusty-winged barbtail, Premnornis guttuliger
Pale-legged hornero, Furnarius leucopus
Sharp-tailed streamcreeper, Lochmias nematura
Chestnut-winged cinclodes, Cinclodes albidiventris
Cinnamon-rumped foliage-gleaner, Philydor pyrrhodes
Montane foliage-gleaner, Anabacerthia striaticollis
Rufous-tailed foliage-gleaner, Anabacerthia ruficaudata
White-throated foliage-gleaner, Syndactyla roraimae
Lineated foliage-gleaner, Syndactyla subalaris
Guttulate foliage-gleaner, Syndactyla guttulata (E)
Buff-fronted foliage-gleaner, Dendroma rufa
Chestnut-winged foliage-gleaner, Dendroma erythroptera
Ruddy foliage-gleaner, Clibanornis rubiginosus
Flammulated treehunter, Thripadectes flammulatus
Striped treehunter, Thripadectes holostictus
Streak-capped treehunter, Thripadectes virgaticeps
Chestnut-crowned foliage-gleaner, Automolus rufipileatus
Buff-throated foliage-gleaner, Automolus ochrolaemus
Striped woodhaunter, Automolus subulatus
Olive-backed foliage-gleaner, Automolus infuscatus
Spotted barbtail, Premnoplex brunnescens
White-throated barbtail, Premnoplex tatei (E)
Pearled treerunner, Margarornis squamiger
Andean tit-spinetail, Leptasthenura andicola
Rufous-fronted thornbird, Phacellodomus rufifrons
White-browed spinetail, Hellmayrea gularis
Streak-backed canastero, Asthenes wyatti
Ochre-browed thistletail, Asthenes coryi (E)
Perija thistletail, Asthenes perijana
White-chinned thistletail, Asthenes fuliginosa
Roraiman barbtail, Roraimia adusta
Orinoco softtail, Thripophaga cherriei
Delta Amacuro softtail, Thripophaga amacurensis (E)
Rusty-backed spinetail, Cranioleuca vulpina
Crested spinetail, Cranioleuca subcristata
Tepui spinetail, Cranioleuca demissa
Streak-capped spinetail, Cranioleuca hellmayri
Speckled spinetail, Cranioleuca gutturata
Yellow-chinned spinetail, Certhiaxis cinnamomeus
Plain-crowned spinetail, Synallaxis gujanensis
McConnell's spinetail, Synallaxis macconnelli
Rio Orinoco spinetail, Synallaxis beverlyae (E)
Pale-breasted spinetail, Synallaxis albescens
Azara's spinetail, Synallaxis azarae
White-whiskered spinetail, Synallaxis candei
Rufous spinetail, Synallaxis unirufa
Black-throated spinetail, Synallaxis castanea (E)
Stripe-breasted spinetail, Synallaxis cinnamomea
Ruddy spinetail, Synallaxis rutilans

Manakins
Order: PasseriformesFamily: Pipridae

The manakins are a family of subtropical and tropical mainland Central and South America, and Trinidad and Tobago. They are compact forest birds, the males typically being brightly colored, although the females of most species are duller and usually green-plumaged. Manakins feed on small fruits, berries and insects. Twenty-one species have been recorded in Venezuela.

Dwarf tyrant-manakin, Tyranneutes stolzmanni
Tiny tyrant-manakin, Tyranneutes virescens
Saffron-crested tyrant-manakin, Neopelma chrysocephalum
Lance-tailed manakin, Chiroxiphia lanceolata
Blue-backed manakin, Chiroxiphia pareola
Golden-winged manakin, Masius chrysopterus
White-bibbed manakin, Corapipo leucorrhoa
White-throated manakin, Corapipo gutturalis
Olive manakin, Xenopipo uniformis
Black manakin, Xenopipo atronitens
Blue-capped manakin, Lepidothrix coronata
Orange-bellied manakin, Lepidothrix suavissima
Yellow-crowned manakin, Heterocercus flavivertex
White-bearded manakin, Manacus manacus
Crimson-hooded manakin, Pipra aureola
Wire-tailed manakin, Pipra filicauda
Striolated manakin, Machaeropterus striolatus
Fiery-capped manakin, Machaeropterus pyrocephalus
White-crowned manakin, Pseudopipra pipra
Scarlet-horned manakin, Ceratopipra cornuta
Golden-headed manakin, Ceratopipra erythrocephala

Cotingas
Order: PasseriformesFamily: Cotingidae

The cotingas are birds of forests or forest edges in tropical South America. Comparatively little is known about this diverse group, although all have broad bills with hooked tips, rounded wings, and strong legs. The males of many of the species are brightly colored, or decorated with plumes or wattles. Twenty-five species have been recorded in Venezuela

Green-and-black fruiteater, Pipreola riefferii
Barred fruiteater, Pipreola arcuata
Golden-breasted fruiteater, Pipreola aureopectus
Handsome fruiteater, Pipreola formosa (E)
Red-banded fruiteater, Pipreola whitelyi
Scaled fruiteater, Ampelioides tschudii
Red-crested cotinga, Ampelion rubrocristata
Guianan red-cotinga, Phoenicircus carnifex
Black-necked red-cotinga, Phoenicircus nigricollis
Guianan cock-of-the-rock, Rupicola rupicola
Andean cock-of-the-rock, Rupicola peruviana
Crimson fruitcrow, Haematoderus militaris (H)
Purple-throated fruitcrow, Querula purpurata
Red-ruffed fruitcrow, Pyroderus scutatus
Amazonian umbrellabird, Cephalopterus ornatus
Capuchinbird, Perissocephalus tricolor
Blue cotinga, Cotinga nattererii
Purple-breasted cotinga, Cotinga cotinga
Spangled cotinga, Cotinga cayana
Rose-collared piha, Lipaugus streptophorus
Screaming piha, Lipaugus vociferans
White bellbird, Procnias alba
Bearded bellbird, Procnias averano
Pompadour cotinga, Xipholena punicea
Bare-necked fruitcrow, Gymnoderus foetidus

Tityras
Order: PasseriformesFamily: Tityridae

Tityridae are suboscine passerine birds found in forest and woodland in the Neotropics. The species in this family were formerly spread over the families Tyrannidae, Pipridae, and Cotingidae. They are small to medium-sized birds. They do not have the sophisticated vocal capabilities of the songbirds. Most, but not all, have plain coloring. Twenty-three species have been recorded in Venezuela.

Black-crowned tityra, Tityra inquisitor
Black-tailed tityra, Tityra cayana
Masked tityra, Tityra semifasciata
Varzea schiffornis, Schiffornis major
Olivaceous schiffornis, Schiffornis olivacea
Russet-winged schiffornis, Schiffornis stenorhyncha
Brown-winged schiffornis, Schiffornis turdina
Cinereous mourner, Laniocera hypopyrra
White-browed purpletuft, Iodopleura isabellae
Dusky purpletuft, Iodopleura fusca
Shrike-like cotinga, Laniisoma elegans
White-naped xenopsaris, Xenopsaris albinucha
Green-backed becard, Pachyramphus viridis
Barred becard, Pachyramphus versicolor
Cinereous becard, Pachyramphus rufus
Cinnamon becard, Pachyramphus cinnamomeus
Chestnut-crowned becard, Pachyramphus castaneus
White-winged becard, Pachyramphus polychopterus
Black-and-white becard, Pachyramphus albogriseus
Black-capped becard, Pachyramphus marginatus
Glossy-backed becard, Pachyramphus surinamus
One-colored becard, Pachyramphus homochrous
Pink-throated becard, Pachyramphus minor

Sharpbill
Order: PasseriformesFamily: Oxyruncidae

The sharpbill is a small bird of dense forests in Central and South America. It feeds mostly on fruit but also eats insects.

Sharpbill, Oxyruncus cristatus

Royal flycatchers
Order: PasseriformesFamily: Onychorhynchidae

In 2019 the SACC determined that these five species, which were formerly considered tyrant flycatchers, belonged in their own family.

Royal flycatcher, Onychorhynchus coronatus
Ruddy-tailed flycatcher, Terenotriccus erythrurus
Tawny-breasted flycatcher, Myiobius villosus
Sulphur-rumped flycatcher, Myiobius barbatus
Black-tailed flycatcher, Myiobius atricaudus

Tyrant flycatchers
Order: PasseriformesFamily: Tyrannidae

Tyrant flycatchers are passerine birds which occur throughout North and South America. They superficially resemble the Old World flycatchers, but are more robust and have stronger bills. They do not have the sophisticated vocal capabilities of the songbirds. Most, but not all, have plain coloring. As the name implies, most are insectivorous. One hundred sixty-seven species have been recorded in Venezuela.

Wing-barred piprites, Piprites chloris
Cinnamon manakin-tyrant, Neopipo cinnamomea
Cinnamon-crested spadebill, Platyrinchus saturatus
White-throated spadebill, Platyrinchus mystaceus
Golden-crowned spadebill, Platyrinchus coronatus
Yellow-throated spadebill, Platyrinchus flavigularis
White-crested spadebill, Platyrinchus platyrhynchos
Rufous-headed pygmy-tyrant, Pseudotriccus ruficeps
Ringed antpipit, Corythopis torquatus
Variegated bristle-tyrant, Phylloscartes poecilotis
Chapman's bristle-tyrant, Phylloscartes chapmani
Marble-faced bristle-tyrant, Phylloscartes ophthalmicus
Venezuelan bristle-tyrant, Phylloscartes venezuelanus (E)
Olive-green tyrannulet, Phylloscartes virescens (H)
Black-fronted tyrannulet, Phylloscartes nigrifrons
Rufous-browed tyrannulet, Phylloscartes superciliaris
Rufous-lored tyrannulet, Phylloscartes flaviventris (E)
Olive-striped flycatcher, Mionectes olivaceus
Ochre-bellied flycatcher, Mionectes oleagineus
McConnell's flycatcher, Mionectes macconnelli
Sierra de Lema flycatcher, Mionectes roraimae
Sepia-capped flycatcher, Leptopogon amaurocephalus
Slaty-capped flycatcher, Leptopogon superciliaris
Rufous-breasted flycatcher, Leptopogon rufipectus
Black-chested tyrant, Taeniotriccus andrei
Olivaceous flatbill, Rhynchocyclus olivaceus
Fulvous-breasted flatbill, Rhynchocyclus fulvipectus
Yellow-olive flycatcher, Tolmomyias sulphurescens
Yellow-margined flycatcher, Tolmomyias assimilis
Gray-crowned flycatcher, Tolmomyias poliocephalus
Yellow-breasted flycatcher, Tolmomyias flaviventris
Short-tailed pygmy-tyrant, Myiornis ecaudatus
Scale-crested pygmy-tyrant, Lophotriccus pileatus
Helmeted pygmy-tyrant, Lophotriccus galeatus
Pale-eyed pygmy-tyrant, Atalotriccus pilaris
Snethlage's tody-tyrant, Hemitriccus minor
White-eyed tody-tyrant, Hemitriccus zosterops
Pearly-vented tody-tyrant, Hemitriccus margaritaceiventer
Black-throated tody-tyrant, Hemitriccus granadensis
Rufous-crowned tody-flycatcher, Poecilotriccus ruficeps
Ruddy tody-flycatcher, Poecilotriccus russatus
Smoky-fronted tody-flycatcher, Poecilotriccus fumifrons
Slate-headed tody-flycatcher, Poecilotriccus sylvia
Spotted tody-flycatcher, Todirostrum maculatum
Common tody-flycatcher, Todirostrum cinereum
Maracaibo tody-flycatcher, Todirostrum viridanum (E)
Black-headed tody-flycatcher, Todirostrum nigriceps
Painted tody-flycatcher, Todirostrum pictum
Cliff flycatcher, Hirundinea ferruginea
Cinnamon flycatcher, Pyrrhomyias cinnamomeus
Venezuelan tyrannulet, Zimmerius petersi (E)
Spectacled tyrannulet, Zimmerius improbus
Slender-footed tyrannulet, Zimmerius gracilipes
Guianan tyrannulet, Zimmerius acer
Golden-faced tyrannulet, Zimmerius chrysops
Lesser wagtail-tyrant, Stigmatura napensis
Slender-billed tyrannulet, Inezia tenuirostris
Amazonian tyrannulet, Inezia subflava
Pale-tipped tyrannulet, Inezia caudata
Fulvous-crowned scrub-tyrant, Euscarthmus meloryphus
Brown-capped tyrannulet, Ornithion brunneicapillus
White-lored tyrannulet, Ornithion inerme
Southern beardless-tyrannulet, Camptostoma obsoletum
Yellow-bellied elaenia, Elaenia flavogaster
Small-billed elaenia, Elaenia parvirostris
Slaty elaenia, Elaenia strepera
Plain-crested elaenia, Elaenia cristata
Lesser elaenia, Elaenia chiriquensis
Rufous-crowned elaenia, Elaenia ruficeps
Mountain elaenia, Elaenia frantzii
Tepui elaenia, Elaenia olivina
Great elaenia, Elaenia dayi
Yellow-crowned tyrannulet, Tyrannulus elatus
Forest elaenia, Myiopagis gaimardii
Gray elaenia, Myiopagis caniceps
Foothill elaenia, Myiopagis olallai
Yellow-crowned elaenia, Myiopagis flavivertex
Greenish elaenia, Myiopagis viridicata
Yellow tyrannulet, Capsiempis flaveola
Rough-legged tyrannulet, Phyllomyias burmeisteri
Urich's tyrannulet, Phyllomyias urichi (E)
Sooty-headed tyrannulet, Phyllomyias griseiceps
Black-capped tyrannulet, Phyllomyias nigrocapillus
Ashy-headed tyrannulet, Phyllomyias cinereiceps
Tawny-rumped tyrannulet, Phyllomyias uropygialis
Mouse-colored tyrannulet, Phaeomyias murina
White-banded tyrannulet, Mecocerculus stictopterus
White-throated tyrannulet, Mecocerculus leucophrys
Sulphur-bellied tyrannulet, Mecocerculus minor
Bearded tachuri, Polystictus pectoralis
Crested doradito, Pseudocolopteryx sclateri
Torrent tyrannulet, Serpophaga cinerea
River tyrannulet, Serpophaga hypoleuca
Agile tit-tyrant, Uromyias agilis
Rufous-tailed attila, Attila phoenicurus
Cinnamon attila, Attila cinnamomeus
Citron-bellied attila, Attila citriniventris
Bright-rumped attila, Attila spadiceus
Piratic flycatcher, Legatus leucophaius
Large-headed flatbill, Ramphotrigon megacephalum
Rufous-tailed flatbill, Ramphotrigon ruficauda
Great kiskadee, Pitangus sulphuratus
Lesser kiskadee, Philohydor lictor
Cattle tyrant, Machetornis rixosa
Sulphury flycatcher, Tyrannopsis sulphurea
Boat-billed flycatcher, Megarynchus pitangua
Golden-crowned flycatcher, Myiodynastes chrysocephalus
Sulphur-bellied flycatcher, Myiodynastes luteiventris (H)
Streaked flycatcher, Myiodynastes maculatus
Rusty-margined flycatcher, Myiozetetes cayanensis
Social flycatcher, Myiozetetes similis
Gray-capped flycatcher, Myiozetetes granadensis
Dusky-chested flycatcher, Myiozetetes luteiventris
Yellow-throated flycatcher, Conopias parvus
Three-striped flycatcher, Conopias trivirgatus
Lemon-browed flycatcher, Conopias cinchoneti
White-bearded flycatcher, Phelpsia inornata
Variegated flycatcher, Empidonomus varius
Crowned slaty flycatcher, Empidonomus aurantioatrocristatus
White-throated kingbird, Tyrannus albogularis
Tropical kingbird, Tyrannus melancholicus
Fork-tailed flycatcher, Tyrannus savana
Eastern kingbird, Tyrannus tyrannus
Gray kingbird, Tyrannus dominicensis
Grayish mourner, Rhytipterna simplex
Pale-bellied mourner, Rhytipterna immunda
White-rumped sirystes, Sirystes albocinereus
Dusky-capped flycatcher, Myiarchus tuberculifer
Swainson's flycatcher, Myiarchus swainsoni
Venezuelan flycatcher, Myiarchus venezuelensis
Panama flycatcher, Myiarchus panamensis
Short-crested flycatcher, Myiarchus ferox
Pale-edged flycatcher, Myiarchus cephalotes
Great crested flycatcher, Myiarchus crinitus
Brown-crested flycatcher, Myiarchus tyrannulus
Long-tailed tyrant, Colonia colonus
Flavescent flycatcher, Myiophobus flavicans
Roraiman flycatcher, Myiophobus roraimae
Bran-colored flycatcher, Myiophobus fasciatus
Crowned chat-tyrant, Ochthoeca frontalis
Yellow-bellied chat-tyrant, Ochthoeca diadema
Slaty-backed chat-tyrant, Ochthoeca cinnamomeiventris
Rufous-breasted chat-tyrant, Ochthoeca rufipectoralis
Brown-backed chat-tyrant, Ochthoeca fumicolor
Northern scrub-flycatcher, Sublegatus arenarum
Amazonian scrub-flycatcher, Sublegatus obscurior
Vermilion flycatcher, Pyrocephalus rubinus
Pied water-tyrant, Fluvicola pica
White-headed marsh tyrant, Arundinicola leucocephala
Riverside tyrant, Knipolegus orenocensis
Rufous-tailed tyrant, Knipolegus poecilurus
Amazonian black-tyrant, Knipolegus poecilocercus
Yellow-browed tyrant, Satrapa icterophrys
Streak-throated bush-tyrant, Myiotheretes striaticollis
Smoky bush-tyrant, Myiotheretes fumigatus
Drab water tyrant, Ochthornis littoralis
Fuscous flycatcher, Cnemotriccus fuscatus
Euler's flycatcher, Lathrotriccus euleri
Black phoebe, Sayornis nigricans
Acadian flycatcher, Empidonax virescens
Willow flycatcher, Empidonax traillii
Alder flycatcher, Empidonax alnorum
Olive-sided flycatcher, Contopus cooperi
Smoke-colored pewee, Contopus fumigatus
Western wood-pewee, Contopus sordidulus
Eastern wood-pewee, Contopus virens
Tropical pewee, Contopus cinereus

Vireos
Order: PasseriformesFamily: Vireonidae

The vireos are a group of small to medium-sized passerine birds. They are typically greenish in color and resemble wood warblers apart from their heavier bills. Twenty-one species have been recorded in Venezuela.

Rufous-browed peppershrike, Cyclarhis gujanensis
Ashy-headed greenlet, Hylophilus pectoralis
Scrub greenlet, Hylophilus flavipes
Gray-chested greenlet, Hylophilus semicinereus
Brown-headed greenlet, Hylophilus brunneiceps
Lemon-chested greenlet, Hylophilus thoracicus
Yellow-browed shrike-vireo, Vireolanius eximius
Slaty-capped shrike-vireo, Vireolanius leucotis
Tawny-crowned greenlet, Tunchiornis ochraceiceps
Dusky-capped greenlet, Pachysylvia hypoxantha
Buff-cheeked greenlet, Pachysylvia muscicapina
Golden-fronted greenlet, Pachysylvia aurantiifrons
Rufous-naped greenlet, Pachysylvia semibrunnea
White-eyed vireo, Vireo griseus (H)
Yellow-throated vireo, Vireo flavifrons
Tepui vireo, Vireo sclateri
Brown-capped vireo, Vireo leucophrys
Red-eyed vireo, Vireo olivaceus
Chivi vireo, Vireo chivi
Yellow-green vireo, Vireo flavoviridis
Black-whiskered vireo, Vireo altiloquus

Jays
Order: PasseriformesFamily: Corvidae

The family Corvidae includes crows, ravens, jays, choughs, magpies, treepies, nutcrackers, and ground jays. Corvids are above average in size among the Passeriformes, and some of the larger species show high levels of intelligence. Six species have been recorded in Venezuela.

Black-collared jay, Cyanolyca armillata
Violaceous jay, Cyanocorax violaceus
Black-chested jay, Cyanocorax affinis
Cayenne jay, Cyanocorax cayanus
Azure-naped jay, Cyanocorax heilprini
Green jay, Cyanocorax yncas

Swallows
Order: PasseriformesFamily: Hirundinidae

The family Hirundinidae is adapted to aerial feeding. They have a slender streamlined body, long pointed wings and a short bill with a wide gape. The feet are adapted to perching rather than walking, and the front toes are partially joined at the base. Twenty species have been recorded in Venezuela.

Blue-and-white swallow, Pygochelidon cyanoleuca
Black-collared swallow, Pygochelidon melanoleuca
Tawny-headed swallow, Alopochelidon fucata
Brown-bellied swallow, Orochelidon murina
Pale-footed swallow, Orochelidon flavipes
White-banded swallow, Atticora fasciata
White-thighed swallow, Atticora tibialis
Southern rough-winged swallow, Stelgidopteryx ruficollis
Brown-chested martin, Progne tapera
Purple martin, Progne subis
Caribbean martin, Progne dominicensis (V)
Cuban martin, Progne cryptoleuca (V)
Gray-breasted martin, Progne chalybea
Southern martin, Progne elegans (H)
Tree swallow, Tachycineta bicolor (H)
White-winged swallow, Tachycineta albiventer
Bank swallow, Riparia riparia
Barn swallow, Hirundo rustica
Cliff swallow, Petrochelidon pyrrhonota
Cave swallow, Petrochelidon fulva (V)

Wrens
Order: PasseriformesFamily: Troglodytidae

The wrens are mainly small and inconspicuous except for their loud songs. These birds have short wings and thin down-turned bills. Several species often hold their tails upright. All are insectivorous. Nineteen species have been recorded in Venezuela.

Scaly-breasted wren, Microcerculus marginatus
Flutist wren, Microcerculus ustulatus
Wing-banded wren, Microcerculus bambla
House wren, Troglodytes aedon
Mountain wren, Troglodytes solstitialis
Tepui wren, Troglodytes rufulus
Grass wren, Cistothorus platensis
Merida wren, Cistothorus meridae (E)
Stripe-backed wren, Campylorhynchus nuchalis
Bicolored wren, Campylorhynchus griseus
Whiskered wren, Pheugopedius mystacalis
Coraya wren, Pheugopedius coraya
Rufous-breasted wren, Pheugopedius rutilus
Rufous-and-white wren, Thryophilus rufalbus
Buff-breasted wren, Cantorchilus leucotis
Rufous wren, Cinnycerthia unirufa
White-breasted wood-wren, Henicorhina leucosticta
Gray-breasted wood-wren, Henicorhina leucophrys
Musician wren, Cyphorhinus arada

Gnatcatchers
Order: PasseriformesFamily: Polioptilidae

These dainty birds resemble Old World warblers in their build and habits, moving restlessly through the foliage seeking insects. The gnatcatchers and gnatwrens are mainly soft bluish gray in color and have the typical insectivore's long sharp bill. They are birds of fairly open woodland or scrub, which nest in bushes or trees. Four species have been recorded in Venezuela.

Collared gnatwren, Microbates collaris
Trilling gnatwren, Ramphocaenus melanurus 
Tropical gnatcatcher, Polioptila plumbea
Rio Negro gnatcatcher, Polioptila facilis

Donacobius
Order: PasseriformesFamily: Donacobiidae

The black-capped donacobius is found in wet habitats from Panama across northern South America and east of the Andes to Argentina and Paraguay.

Black-capped donacobius, Donacobius atricapilla

Dippers
Order: PasseriformesFamily: Cinclidae

Dippers are a group of perching birds whose habitat includes aquatic environments in the Americas, Europe and Asia. They are named for their bobbing or dipping movements. One species has been recorded in Venezuela.

White-capped dipper, Cinclus leucocephalus

Waxwings
Order: PasseriformesFamily: Bombycillidae

The waxwings are a group of birds with soft silky plumage and unique red tips to some of the wing feathers. In the Bohemian and cedar waxwings, these tips look like sealing wax and give the group its name. These are arboreal birds of northern forests. They live on insects in summer and berries in winter. One species has been recorded in Venezuela.

Cedar waxwing, Bombycilla cedrorum (V)

Thrushes
Order: PasseriformesFamily: Turdidae

The thrushes are a group of passerine birds that occur mainly in the Old World. They are plump, soft plumaged, small to medium-sized insectivores or sometimes omnivores, often feeding on the ground. Many have attractive songs. Twenty-three species have been recorded in Venezuela.

Andean solitaire, Myadestes ralloides
Orange-billed nightingale-thrush, Catharus aurantiirostris
Slaty-backed nightingale-thrush, Catharus fuscater
Speckled nightingale-thrush, Catharus maculatus
Veery, Catharus fuscescens 
Gray-cheeked thrush, Catharus minimus
Swainson's thrush, Catharus ustulatus
Rufous-brown solitaire, Cichlopsis leucogenys
Pale-eyed thrush, Turdus leucops
Yellow-legged thrush, Turdus flavipes
Pale-breasted thrush, Turdus leucomelas
Cocoa thrush, Turdus fumigatus
Spectacled thrush, Turdus nudigenis
Lawrence's thrush, Turdus lawrencii
Pantepui thrush, Turdus murinus
Black-billed thrush, Turdus ignobilis
Campina thrush, Turdus arthuri
Chestnut-bellied thrush, Turdus fulviventris
Black-hooded thrush, Turdus olivater
Great thrush, Turdus fuscater
Glossy-black thrush, Turdus serranus
White-necked thrush, Turdus albicollis

Mockingbirds
Order: PasseriformesFamily: Mimidae

The mimids are a family of passerine birds that includes thrashers, mockingbirds, tremblers, and the New World catbirds. These birds are notable for their vocalizations, especially their ability to mimic a wide variety of birds and other sounds heard outdoors. Their coloring tends towards dull-grays and browns. Two species have been recorded in Venezuela.

Tropical mockingbird, Mimus gilvus
Pearly-eyed thrasher, Margarops fuscatus (extirpated)

Weavers
Order: PasseriformesFamily: Ploceidae

The weavers are small passerine birds related to the finches. They are seed-eating birds with rounded conical bills. The males of many species are brightly colored, usually in red or yellow and black; some species show variation in color only in the breeding season. One species has been recorded in Venezuela.

Village weaver, Ploceus cucullatus (I)

Estreldids
Order: PasseriformesFamily: Estrildidae

The estrildid finches are small passerine birds of the Old World tropics and Australasia. They are gregarious and often colonial seed eaters with short thick but pointed bills. They are all similar in structure and habits, but have wide variation in plumage colors and patterns. Two species have been recorded in Venezuela.

Tricolored munia, Lonchura malacca (I)
Java sparrow, Padda oryzivora (I)

Old World sparrows
Order: PasseriformesFamily: Passeridae

Old World sparrows are small passerine birds. In general, sparrows tend to be small, plump, brown or gray birds with short tails and short powerful beaks. Sparrows are seed eaters, but they also consume small insects. One species has been recorded in Venezuela.

House sparrow, Passer domesticus (I)

Pipits and wagtails
Order: PasseriformesFamily: Motacillidae

Motacillidae is a family of small passerine birds with medium to long tails. They include the wagtails, longclaws, and pipits. They are slender ground-feeding insectivores of open country. Two species have been recorded in Venezuela.

Yellowish pipit, Anthus chii
Paramo pipit, Anthus bogotensis

Finches
Order: PasseriformesFamily: Fringillidae

Finches are seed-eating passerine birds that are small to moderately large and have a strong beak, usually conical and in some species very large. All have twelve tail feathers and nine primaries. These birds have a bouncing flight with alternating bouts of flapping and gliding on closed wings, and most sing well. Twenty species have been recorded in Venezuela.

Andean siskin, Spinus spinescens
Yellow-faced siskin, Spinus yarrellii (H)
Red siskin, Spinus cucullatus
Hooded siskin, Spinus magellanicus
Yellow-bellied siskin, Spinus xanthogastrus
Lesser goldfinch, Spinus psaltria
Golden-rumped euphonia, Chlorophonia cyanocephala
Blue-naped chlorophonia, Chlorophonia cyanea
Chestnut-breasted chlorophonia, Chlorophonia pyrrhophrys
Plumbeous euphonia, Euphonia plumbea
Purple-throated euphonia, Euphonia chlorotica
Finsch's euphonia, Euphonia finschi
Trinidad euphonia, Euphonia trinitatis
Golden-bellied euphonia, Euphonia chrysopasta
White-vented euphonia, Euphonia minuta
Violaceous euphonia, Euphonia violacea
Thick-billed euphonia, Euphonia laniirostris
Orange-bellied euphonia, Euphonia xanthogaster
Golden-sided euphonia, Euphonia cayennensis
Rufous-bellied euphonia, Euphonia rufiventris

Thrush-tanager
Order: PasseriformesFamily: Rhodinocichlidae

This species was historically placed in family Thraupidae, the "true" tanagers. It was placed in its own family in 2017.

Rosy thrush-tanager, Rhodinocichla rosea

Sparrows
Order: PasseriformesFamily: Passerellidae

Most of the species are known as sparrows, but these birds are not closely related to the Old World sparrows which are in the family Passeridae. Many of these have distinctive head patterns. Twenty-one species have been recorded in Venezuela.

Ashy-throated chlorospingus, Chlorospingus canigularis
Common chlorospingus, Chlorospingus flavopectus
Grassland sparrow, Ammodramus humeralis
Yellow-browed sparrow, Ammodramus aurifrons
Black-striped sparrow, Arremonops conirostris
Tocuyo sparrow, Arremonops tocuyensis
Perija brushfinch, Arremon perijanus
Caracas brushfinch, Arremon phygas (E)
Paria brushfinch, Arremon phygas (E)
Gray-browed brushfinch, Arremon assimilis
Golden-winged sparrow, Arremon schlegeli
Pectoral sparrow, Arremon taciturnus
Chestnut-capped brushfinch, Arremon brunneinucha
Rufous-collared sparrow, Zonotrichia capensis
Lincoln's sparrow, Melospiza lincolnii (V)
Moustached brushfinch, Atlapetes albofrenatus
Tepui brushfinch, Atlapetes personatus
Ochre-breasted brushfinch, Atlapetes semirufus
Slaty brushfinch, Atlapetes schistaceus
Pale-naped brushfinch, Atlapetes pallidinucha
Yellow-breasted brushfinch, Atlapetes latinuchus

Blackbirds
Order: PasseriformesFamily: Icteridae

The icterids are a group of small to medium-sized, often colorful, passerine birds restricted to the New World and include the grackles, New World blackbirds, and New World orioles. Most species have black as the predominant plumage color, often enlivened by yellow, orange, or red. Twenty-nine species have been recorded in Venezuela.

Bobolink, Dolichonyx oryzivorus
Eastern meadowlark, Sturnella magna
Red-breasted meadowlark, Leistes militaris
Yellow-billed cacique, Amblycercus holosericeus
Russet-backed oropendola, Psarocolius angustifrons
Green oropendola, Psarocolius viridis
Crested oropendola, Psarocolius decumanus
Olive oropendola, Psarocolius bifasciatus
Solitary black cacique, Cacicus solitarius
Scarlet-rumped cacique, Cacicus uropygialis
Yellow-rumped cacique, Cacicus cela
Mountain cacique, Cacicus chrysonotus
Red-rumped cacique, Cacicus haemorrhous
Venezuelan troupial, Icterus icterus
Yellow-tailed oriole, Icterus mesomelas
Epaulet oriole, Icterus cayanensis
Orchard oriole, Icterus spurius
Orange-crowned oriole, Icterus auricapillus
Yellow-backed oriole, Icterus chrysater
Baltimore oriole, Icterus galbula
Yellow oriole, Icterus nigrogularis
Giant cowbird, Molothrus oryzivorus
Shiny cowbird, Molothrus bonariensis
Carib grackle, Quiscalus lugubris
Great-tailed grackle, Quiscalus mexicanus
Velvet-fronted grackle, Lampropsar tanagrinus
Oriole blackbird, Gymnomystax mexicanus
Golden-tufted grackle, Macroagelaius imthurni
Yellow-hooded blackbird, Chrysomus icterocephalus

Wood-warblers
Order: PasseriformesFamily: Parulidae

The wood-warblers are a group of small, often colorful, passerine birds restricted to the New World. Most are arboreal, but some are terrestrial. Most members of this family are insectivores. Fifty species have been recorded in Venezuela.

Ovenbird, Seiurus aurocapilla
Worm-eating warbler, Helmitheros vermivorum (V)
Northern waterthrush, Parkesia noveboracensis
Louisiana waterthrush, Parkesia motacilla
Golden-winged warbler, Vermivora chrysoptera
Blue-winged warbler, Vermivora cyanoptera (H)
Black-and-white warbler, Mniotilta varia
Prothonotary warbler, Protonotaria citrea
Tennessee warbler, Oreothlypis peregrina
Connecticut warbler, Oporornis agilis
Masked yellowthroat, Geothlypis aequinoctialis
Mourning warbler, Geothlypis philadelphia
Kentucky warbler, Geothlypis formosa (V)
Common yellowthroat, Geothlypis trichas (V)
Hooded warbler, Setophaga citrina (V)
American redstart, Setophaga ruticilla
Cape May warbler, Setophaga tigrina
Cerulean warbler, Setophaga cerulea
Northern parula, Setophaga americana (V)
Tropical parula, Setophaga pitiayumi
Magnolia warbler, Setophaga magnolia (V)
Bay-breasted warbler, Setophaga castanea
Blackburnian warbler, Setophaga fusca
Yellow warbler, Setophaga petechia
Chestnut-sided warbler, Setophaga pensylvanica
Blackpoll warbler, Setophaga striata
Black-throated blue warbler, Setophaga caerulescens
Palm warbler, Setophaga palmarum (V)
Yellow-rumped warbler, Setophaga coronata (V)
Yellow-throated warbler, Setophaga dominica (V)
Black-throated green warbler, Setophaga virens
Citrine warbler, Myiothlypis luteoviridis
Flavescent warbler, Myiothlypis flaveola
Black-crested warbler, Myiothlypis nigrocristata
Riverbank warbler, Myiothlypis rivularis
Two-banded warbler, Myiothlypis bivittata
Gray-throated warbler, Myiothlypis cinereicollis
Russet-crowned warbler, Myiothlypis coronata
Rufous-capped warbler, Basileuterus rufifrons
Golden-crowned warbler, Basileuterus culicivorus
Three-striped warbler, Basileuterus tristriatus
Gray-headed warbler, Basileuterus griseiceps (E)
Canada warbler, Cardellina canadensis
Slate-throated redstart, Myioborus miniatus
White-fronted redstart, Myioborus albifrons (E)
Golden-fronted redstart, Myioborus ornatus
Paria redstart, Myioborus pariae (E)
White-faced redstart, Myioborus albifacies (E)
Saffron-breasted redstart, Myioborus cardonai (E)
Tepui redstart, Myioborus castaneocapilla

Mitrospingids
Order: PasseriformesFamily: Mitrospingidae

Until 2017 the four species in this family were included in the family Thraupidae, the "true" tanagers.

Olive-backed tanager, Mitrospingus oleagineus

Cardinal grosbeaks
Order: PasseriformesFamily: Cardinalidae

The cardinals are a family of robust, seed-eating birds with strong bills. They are typically associated with open woodland. The sexes usually have distinct plumages. Nineteen species have been recorded in Venezuela.

Hepatic tanager, Piranga flava
Summer tanager, Piranga rubra
Scarlet tanager, Piranga olivacea
White-winged tanager, Piranga leucoptera
Red-crowned ant-tanager, Habia rubica
Golden grosbeak, Pheucticus chrysogaster
Black-backed grosbeak, Pheucticus aureoventris
Rose-breasted grosbeak, Pheucticus ludovicianus
Rose-breasted chat, Granatellus pelzelni
Vermilion cardinal, Cardinalis phoeniceus
Yellow-green grosbeak, Caryothraustes canadensis
Red-and-black grosbeak, Periporphyrus erythromelas
Carrizal seedeater, Amaurospiza carrizalensis (E)
Blue-black grosbeak, Cyanoloxia cyanoides
Amazonian grosbeak, Cyanoloxia rothschildii
Ultramarine grosbeak, Cyanoloxia brissonii
Blue grosbeak, Passerina caerulea (V)
Indigo bunting, Passerina cyanea (V)
Dickcissel, Spiza americana

Tanagers
Order: PasseriformesFamily: Thraupidae

The tanagers are a large group of small to medium-sized passerine birds restricted to the New World, mainly in the tropics. Many species are brightly colored. As a family they are omnivorous, but individual species specialize in eating fruits, seeds, insects, or other types of food. Most have short, rounded wings. One hundred twenty-seven species have been recorded in Venezuela.

Blue-backed tanager, Cyanicterus cyanicterus
Hooded tanager, Nemosia pileata
White-capped tanager, Sericossypha albocristata
Plushcap, Catamblyrhynchus diadema
Green honeycreeper, Chlorophanes spiza
Guira tanager, Hemithraupis guira
Yellow-backed tanager, Hemithraupis flavicollis
Bicolored conebill, Conirostrum bicolor
Chestnut-vented conebill, Conirostrum speciosum
White-eared conebill, Conirostrum leucogenys
Blue-backed conebill, Conirostrum sitticolor
Capped conebill, Conirostrum albifrons
Rufous-browed conebill, Conirostrum rufum
Stripe-tailed yellow-finch, Sicalis citrina
Orange-fronted yellow-finch, Sicalis columbiana
Saffron finch, Sicalis flaveola
Grassland yellow-finch, Sicalis luteola
Plumbeous sierra finch, Geospizopsis unicolor
Plain-colored seedeater, Catamenia inornata
Paramo seedeater, Catamenia homochroa
Glossy flowerpiercer, Diglossa lafresnayii
Merida flowerpiercer, Diglossa gloriosa (E)
Black flowerpiercer, Diglossa humeralis
Venezuelan flowerpiercer, Diglossa venezuelensis (E)
White-sided flowerpiercer, Diglossa albilatera
Scaled flowerpiercer, Diglossa duidae
Greater flowerpiercer, Diglossa major
Rusty flowerpiercer, Diglossa sittoides
Bluish flowerpiercer, Diglossa caerulescens
Masked flowerpiercer, Diglossa cyanea
Slaty finch, Haplospiza rustica
Blue-black grassquit, Volatinia jacarina
Rufous-crested tanager, Creurgops verticalis
Flame-crested tanager, Loriotus cristatus
White-shouldered tanager, Loriotus luctuosus
Fulvous-crested tanager, Tachyphonus surinamus
White-lined tanager, Tachyphonus rufus
Red-shouldered tanager, Tachyphonus phoenicius
Gray-headed tanager, Eucometis penicillata
Pileated finch, Coryphospingus pileatus
Crimson-backed tanager, Ramphocelus dimidiatus
Silver-beaked tanager, Ramphocelus carbo
Fulvous shrike-tanager, Lanio fulvus
Short-billed honeycreeper, Cyanerpes nitidus
Purple honeycreeper, Cyanerpes caeruleus
Red-legged honeycreeper, Cyanerpes cyaneus
Swallow tanager, Tersina viridis
White-bellied dacnis, Dacnis albiventris
Black-faced dacnis, Dacnis lineata
Yellow-bellied dacnis, Dacnis flaviventer
Blue dacnis, Dacnis cayana
Lesson's seedeater, Sporophila bouvronides
Lined seedeater, Sporophila lineola
Chestnut-bellied seedeater, Sporophila castaneiventris
Ruddy-breasted seedeater, Sporophila minuta
Chestnut-bellied seed-finch, Sporophila angolensis
Great-billed seed-finch, Sporophila maximiliani
Large-billed seed-finch, Sporophila crassirostris
Gray seedeater, Sporophila intermedia
Wing-barred seedeater, Sporophila americana
White-naped seedeater, Sporophila fringilloides
Black-and-white seedeater, Sporophila luctuosa
Yellow-bellied seedeater, Sporophila nigricollis
Slate-colored seedeater, Sporophila schistacea
Plumbeous seedeater, Sporophila plumbea
Buff-throated saltator, Saltator maximus
Orinocan saltator, Saltator orenocensis
Olive-gray saltator, Saltator olivascens
Streaked saltator, Saltator striatipectus
Slate-colored grosbeak, Saltator grossus
Wedge-tailed grass-finch, Emberizoides herbicola
Duida grass-finch, Emberizoides duidae (E)
Black-headed hemispingus, Pseudospingus verticalis
Gray-hooded bush tanager, Cnemoscopus rubrirostris
Slaty-backed hemispingus, Poospiza goeringi (E)
Gray-capped hemispingus, Kleinothraupis reyi (E)
Black-capped hemispingus, Kleinothraupis atropileus
Oleaginous hemispingus, Sphenopsis frontalis
Black-eared hemispingus, Sphenopsis melanotis
Orange-headed tanager, Thlypopsis sordida
Fulvous-headed tanager, Thlypopsis fulviceps
Superciliaried hemispingus, Thlypopsis superciliaris
Bananaquit, Coereba flaveola
Yellow-faced grassquit, Tiaris olivaceus
Dull-colored grassquit, Asemospiza obscura
Sooty grassquit, Asemospiza fuliginosa
Black-faced grassquit, Melanospiza bicolor
Orange-eared tanager, Chlorochrysa calliparaea
Masked cardinal, Paroaria nigrogenis
Red-capped cardinal, Paroaria gularis
Black-faced tanager, Schistochlamys melanopis
Magpie tanager, Cissopis leverianus
Golden-crowned tanager, Iridosornis rufivertex
Fawn-breasted tanager, Pipraeidea melanonota
Buff-breasted mountain tanager, Dubusia taeniata
Lacrimose mountain tanager, Anisognathus lacrymosus
Scarlet-bellied mountain tanager, Anisognathus igniventris
Blue-winged mountain tanager, Anisognathus somptuosus
Hooded mountain tanager, Buthraupis montana
Masked mountain tanager, Tephrospilus wetmorei
Blue-capped tanager, Sporathraupis cyanocephala
Black-chested mountain tanager, Cnemathraupis eximia
Black-headed tanager, Stilpnia cyanoptera
Black-capped tanager, Stilpnia heinei
Burnished-buff tanager, Stilpnia cayana
Scrub tanager, Stilpnia vitriolina
Masked tanager, Stilpnia nigrocincta
Blue-necked tanager, Stilpnia cyanicollis
Blue-and-black tanager, Tangara vassorii
Beryl-spangled tanager, Tangara nigroviridis
Turquoise tanager, Tangara mexicana
Paradise tanager, Tangara chilensis
Opal-rumped tanager, Tangara velia
Bay-headed tanager, Tangara gyrola
Rufous-cheeked tanager, Tangara rufigenis (E)
Saffron-crowned tanager, Tangara xanthocephala
Flame-faced tanager, Tangara parzudakii
Green-and-gold tanager, Tangara schrankii
Golden tanager, Tangara arthus
Blue-gray tanager, Thraupis episcopus
Glaucous tanager, Thraupis glaucocolpa
Palm tanager, Thraupis palmarum
Dotted tanager, Ixothraupis varia
Speckled tanager, Ixothraupis guttata
Yellow-bellied tanager, Ixothraupis xanthogastra
Spotted tanager, Ixothraupis punctata

Notes

References

See also
 List of echinoderms of Venezuela
 List of Poriferans of Venezuela
 List of introduced molluscs of Venezuela
 List of marine molluscs of Venezuela
 List of molluscs of Falcón state, Venezuela
 List of non-marine molluscs of El Hatillo Municipality, Miranda, Venezuela
 List of non-marine molluscs of Venezuela
 List of mammals of Venezuela
List of birds
Lists of birds by region

Other reading

Venezuela
 
Birds
Venezuela